Voznesenka is a rural locality (a selo) and the administrative centre of Voznesensky Selsoviet, Duvansky District, Bashkortostan, Russia. The population was 1,217 as of 2010. There are 5 streets.

Geography 
Voznesenka is located 42 km northwest of Mesyagutovo (the district's administrative centre) by road. Tastuba is the nearest rural locality.

References 

Rural localities in Duvansky District